This is a list of high schools in the U.S. state of Florida.

Alachua County

First Christian Academy, High Springs
Hawthorne Middle/High School, Hawthorne
Newberry High School, Newberry
Santa Fe High School, Alachua

Gainesville

Public/magnet/charter

Alachua eSchool 
Buchholz High School
Eastside High School
Gainesville High School
Loften High School
P. K. Yonge Developmental Research School
SIATech Gainesville

Private/religious

Christian Life Academy 
Cornerstone Academy 
Oak Hall High School
Passage Christian Academy 
The Rock School 
St. Francis High School
Windsor Christian Academy

Baker County
Baker County High School, Glen St. Mary

Bay County
J.R. Arnold High School, Panama City Beach

Lynn Haven

A. Crawford Mosley High School
New Horizons Learning Center

Panama City

Public

A.D. Harris High School
Bay High School
Deane Bozeman School
Rutherford High School

Charter/magnet

AMIKids Panama City Marine Institute 
Chautauqua Learn & Serve Charter School 
Haney Technical High School
Newpoint Bay High School
North Bay Haven Career Academy 
Palm Bay Prep Academy
Rising Leaders Academy 
Rosenwald High School

Private/religious

Covenant Christian School
Panama City Advanced School

Bradford County

Starke

Bradford High School
Bradford-Union Technical Center
Hope Christian Academy 
Northside Christian Academy

Brevard County

Cocoa Beach High School, Cocoa Beach
Rockledge High School, Rockledge
Satellite High School, Satellite Beach
Viera High School, Viera

Cocoa

Cocoa High School
Space Coast Christian Academy
Space Coast Junior/Senior High School

Melbourne

Eau Gallie High School
Florida Preparatory Academy
Holy Trinity Episcopal Academy
Melbourne Central Catholic High School
Melbourne High School
Palm Bay Magnet High School
Parkhurst Academy
RFM Christian Academy
Sancta Familia Academy
Wade Christian Academy
West Shore Junior – Senior High School

Merritt Island

Brevard Private Academy 
Edgewood Junior/Senior High School
Merritt Island Christian School 
Merritt Island High School

Palm Bay

Bayside High School
Covenant Christian School
Heritage High School
Odyssey Charter School 
Riverdale Country School

Titusville

Astronaut High School
Titusville High School

West Melbourne

Brevard Academy 
West Melbourne Christian Academy

Broward County

Hallandale High School, Hallandale Beach
Lauderhill 6-12 STEM-MED, Lauderhill
Marjory Stoneman Douglas High School, Parkland
Millennium 6-12 Collegiate Academy, Tamarac
Piper High School, Sunrise

Coconut Creek

Atlantic Technical Center
Coconut Creek High School
Monarch High School
North Broward Preparatory School

Cooper City

Cooper City Christian Academy 
Cooper City High School
Westlake Preparatory School & Academy

Coral Springs

Coral Glades High School
Coral Springs Charter School
Coral Springs Christian Academy
Coral Springs High School
J. P. Taravella High School

Davie

American Preparatory Academy 
College Academy at Broward Community College
Conservatory Prep Senior High School
McFatter Technical Center
Nova High School
Sterling Academy 
University School of Nova Southeastern University
Western High School

Deerfield Beach

Deerfield Beach High School
Highlands Christian Academy

Fort Lauderdale

Academic Solutions Academy
Archbishop Edward A. McCarthy High School
Calvary Christian Academy
Cardinal Gibbons High School
Dillard High School
Fort Lauderdale High School
Fort Lauderdale Preparatory School
Holy Temple Christian Academy 
Pine Crest School
St. Thomas Aquinas High School
Stranahan High School
Westminster Academy

Hollywood

Avant Garde Academy Broward 
Ben Gamla Charter School
Calvary Christian Academy 
Chaminade-Madonna College Preparatory School
Hollywood Hills High School
International School of Broward
McArthur High School
Sheridan Hills Christian School 
South Broward High School

Lauderdale Lakes, Florida

Boyd H. Anderson High School
Rhema Word Christian Academy

Margate, Florida

Ascend Academy Charter High School
Broward Math & Science Schools 
Phyl's Academy

Miramar, Florida

Everglades High School
Miramar High School

Oakland Park, Florida

Lighthouse Christian Academy 
Northeast High School

Pembroke Pines, Florida

Charles W. Flanagan High School
Pembroke Pines Charter High School
West Broward High School

Plantation

American Heritage School
David Posnack Hebrew Day School
Plantation High School
South Plantation High School

Pompano Beach

Blanche Ely High School
Pompano Beach High School

Weston, Florida

Cypress Bay High School
Sagemont Upper School

Calhoun County
Altha Public School (K-12), Altha
Blountstown High School, Blountstown

Charlotte County
Charlotte High School, Punta Gorda
Lemon Bay High School, Englewood
Port Charlotte High School, Port Charlotte

Citrus County

Public
Citrus High School, Inverness
Crystal River High School, Crystal River
Cypress Creek Academy, Lecanto
Lecanto High School, Lecanto
Withlacoochee Technical Institute, Inverness

Charter
Academy of Environmental Science, Crystal River

Clay County
Clay High School, Green Cove Springs
Fleming Island High School, Orange Park
Keystone Heights Junior-Senior High School, Keystone Heights
Middleburg High School, Middleburg
Oakleaf High School, Orange Park
Orange Park High School, Orange Park
Ridgeview High School, Orange Park
St. Johns Country Day School, Orange Park

Collier County
Barron G. Collier High School, Naples
The Community School of Naples, Naples
Everglades High School, Everglades City
First Baptist Academy High School, Naples
Golden Gate High School, Naples
Gulf Coast High School, Naples
Immokalee High School, Immokalee
Lely High School, Naples
Lorenzo Walker Technical High School, Naples
Naples High School, Naples
Palmetto Ridge High School, Naples
Rhodora J. Donahue Academy of Ave Maria, Ave Maria
St. John Neumann High School, Naples
Seacrest Country Day School, Naples

Columbia County
Challenge Learning Center, Lake City
Columbia High School, Lake City
Fort White High School, Fort White
Lake City Christian Academy, Lake City

DeSoto County
DeSoto High School, Arcadia
Heritage Baptist Academy, Arcadia
Life Christian Academy, Arcadia
Peace River Valley Church Academy, Arcadia

Dixie County
Dixie County High School, Cross City

Duval County

Public
A. Philip Randolph Academies of Technology, Jacksonville
Andrew Jackson High School, Jacksonville
Atlantic Coast High School, Jacksonville
Baldwin Middle-Senior High, Baldwin
Douglas Anderson School of the Arts, Jacksonville
Duncan U. Fletcher High School, Neptune Beach
Edward H. White High School, Jacksonville
Englewood High School, Jacksonville
First Coast High School, Jacksonville
Frank H. Peterson Academies of Technology, Jacksonville
Jean Ribault High School, Jacksonville
Robert E. Lee High School, Jacksonville
Sandalwood High School, Jacksonville
Samuel W. Wolfson High School, Jacksonville
Terry Parker High School, Jacksonville
Westside High School, Jacksonville
William M. Raines High School, Jacksonville

Magnet
Darnell-Cookman School of the Medical Arts, Jacksonville
Mandarin High School, Jacksonville
Paxon School for Advanced Studies, Jacksonville
Stanton College Preparatory School, Jacksonville

Alternative
Grand Park Center, Jacksonville
Marine Science Education Center, Atlantic Beach

Charter
Duval Charter High School at Baymeadows
Pathways Academy
River City Science Academy
School for Integrated Academics and Technology
SOS Academy Charter
Wayman Academy of the Arts

Private
Arlington Country Day School, Jacksonville
Bishop Kenny High School, Jacksonville
Bishop Snyder High School, Jacksonville
Bolles School, Jacksonville
Christian Heritage Academy, Jacksonville
Christ's Church Academy, Jacksonville
Episcopal High School, Jacksonville
First Coast Christian School, Jacksonville
Jacksonville Country Day School, Jacksonville
Parson's Christian Academy, Jacksonville
Potter's House Christian Academy, Jacksonville
Providence School, Jacksonville
Seacoast Christian Academy, Jacksonville
Trinity Christian Academy, Jacksonville
University Christian School, Jacksonville
West Meadows Baptist Academy, Jacksonville
Victory Christian Acadamy, Jacksonville

Escambia County
Booker T. Washington High School, Pensacola
East Hill Christian School, Pensacola
Escambia Charter School, Gonzalez
Escambia High School, Pensacola
J. M. Tate High School, Gonzalez
Northview High School, Century
Pensacola Catholic High School, Pensacola
Pensacola High School, Pensacola
Pensacola School Of Liberal Arts, Pensacola
Pine Forest High School, Pensacola
Ruby J. Gainer Charter School, Pensacola
West Florida High School of Advanced Technology, Pensacola
Woodham High School, Pensacola (currently being used as a middle school)

Flagler County
Flagler Palm Coast High School, Palm Coast
Matanzas High School, Palm Coast

Franklin County
Franklin County School, Eastpoint

Gadsden County
East Gadsden High School, Havana
West Gadsen High School, Greensboro

Private
Tallavana Christian School, Havana

Gilchrist County
Bell High School, Bell
Trenton High School, Trenton

Glades County
Moore Haven Junior/Senior High School, Moore Haven

Gulf County
Port St. Joe High School, Port St. Joe
Wewahitchka High School, Wewahitchka

Hamilton County
Corinth Christian Academy, Jasper
Hamilton County High School, Jasper

Hardee County
Hardee Senior High School, Wauchula

Hendry County
Ahfachkee Day School, Clewiston
Clewiston High School, Clewiston
International Christian Academy, LaBelle
LaBelle High School, LaBelle

Hernando County
Central High School, Brooksville
Frank W. Springstead High School, Spring Hill
Hernando Christian Academy, Brooksville
Hernando High School, Brooksville
Nature Coast Technical High School, Brooksville
Spring Hill Christian Academy, Spring Hill
Weeki Wachee High School, Weeki Wachee
West Hernando Christian School, Spring Hill

Highlands County
Avon Park High School, Avon Park
Heartland Christian School, Sebring
Lake Placid High School, Lake Placid
Sebring High School, Sebring
Walker Memorial Academy, Avon Park

Hillsborough County
A. P. Leto High School, Tampa
Academy of the Holy Names (all-female), Tampa
Armwood High School, Seffner
Bayshore Christian School, Tampa
Bell Creek Academy, Riverview
Berkeley Preparatory School, Tampa
Bloomingdale High School, Valrico
Brandon High School, Brandon
Braulio Alonso High School, Tampa
Brooks-DeBartolo Collegiate High School, Tampa
C. Leon King High School, Tampa
Carrollwood Day School, Carrolwood
Central Baptist School, Brandon
Durant High School, Plant City
Earl J. Lennard High School, Ruskin
East Bay High School, Gibsonton
Faith Baptist School, Brandon
Falkenburg Academy, Tampa
Florida College Academy, Temple Terrace
Foundation Christian Academy, Valrico
Freedom High School, Tampa
George D. Chamberlain High School, Tampa
George S. Middleton High School, Tampa
Grace Christian School, Valrico
Henry B. Plant High School, Tampa
Heritage Academy
Hillsborough Baptist School, Seffner
Hillsborough High School, Tampa
Howard W. Blake High School, Tampa
Jesuit High School of Tampa (all-male), Tampa
Joe E. Newsome High School, Lithia
Legacy Christian Academy, Seffner
Millburn High School, Tampa
Paul R. Wharton High School, Tampa
Pepin Academy, Tampa
Pivot Charter School, Riverview
Plant City High School, Plant City
Providence Christian School, Riverview
Riverview High School, Riverview
St. Stephen Catholic School, Lithia
Seffner Christian Academy, Seffner
Seminole Heights Charter School, Tampa
Sickles High School, Tampa
Spoto High School, Riverview
Steinbrenner High School, Lutz
Sumner High School, Riverview
Tampa Baptist Academy, Tampa
Tampa Bay Technical High School, Tampa
Tampa Catholic High School, Tampa
Tampa Preparatory School, Tampa
Thomas Jefferson High School, Tampa
Thomas Richard Robinson High School, Tampa
Tropical Acres Christian Academy, Riverview
Vivian Gaither High School, Tampa
West University Charter School, Tampa

Holmes County
Bethlehem High School, Bonifay
Holmes County High School, Bonifay
Ponce de Leon High School, Ponce de Leon
Poplar Springs High School, Graceville

Indian River County
Indian River Charter High School, Vero Beach
Saint Edwards School, Vero Beach
Sebastian River High School, Sebastian
Vero Beach High School, Vero Beach

Jackson County
Cottondale High School, Cottondale
Graceville High School, Graceville
Grand Ridge High School, Grand Ridge
Hope School, Marianna
Jackson Academy of Applied Technology, Marianna
Malone High School, Malone
Marianna High School, Marianna
Sneads High School, Sneads

Jefferson County
Aucilla Christian Academy, Monticello
Jefferson County Middle / High School, Monticello

Lafayette County
Lafayette High School, Mayo
Lighthouse Christian School, Mayo

Lake County
East Ridge High School, Clermont
Eustis High School, Eustis
Lake Minneola High School, Minneola
Leesburg High School, Leesburg
Mount Dora High School, Mount Dora
South Lake High School, Groveland
Tavares High School, Tavares
 Umatilla High School, Umatilla

Private
Christian Home & Bible School, aka Mount Dora Bible, Mount Dora
Faith Lutheran School, Eustis
First Academy High School, Leesburg
Hampden DuBose Academy, Mount Dora
Montverde Academy, Montverde
Real Life Christian Academy, Clermont

Charter
Alee Academy Charter, Umatilla
The Villages Charter High School, The Villages

Lee County
Bonita Springs High School, Bonita Springs
Cape Coral High School, Cape Coral
Cypress Lake High School, Fort Myers
Dunbar High School, Fort Myers
East Lee County High School, Lehigh Acres
Estero High School, Estero
Fort Myers Senior High School, Fort Myers
Gateway High School, Fort Myers
Ida S. Baker High School, Cape Coral
Island Coast High School, Cape Coral
Lee County High Technical Center Central, Fort Myers
Lee County High Technology Center North, Cape Coral
Lehigh Senior High School, Lehigh Acres
Mariner High School, Cape Coral
North Fort Myers High School, North Fort Myers
Riverdale High School, Fort Myers
South Fort Myers High School, Fort Myers

Charter
Florida SouthWestern Collegiate High School, Fort Myers
Gateway Charter High School, Fort Myers
Oasis Charter High School, Cape Coral
Pivot Charter High School, Fort Myers

Private
Bishop Verot High School, Fort Myers
Canterbury School, Fort Myers
Cape Coral Christian School, Cape Coral
Evangelical Christian School, Fort Myers
Southwest Florida Marine Institute, Fort Myers

Leon County
Amos P. Godby High School, Tallahassee
Christ Classical Academy School, Tallahassee
Community Christian School, Tallahassee
Ecclesia Christian Academy, Tallahassee
Florida Agricultural and Mechanical High School, Tallahassee
Florida State University School/Florida High, Tallahassee
James S. Rickards High School, Tallahassee
John Paul II Catholic High School, Tallahassee
Lawton Chiles High School, Tallahassee
Leon High School, Tallahassee
Lighthouse Christian Academy, Tallahassee
Lincoln High School, Tallahassee
Maclay School, Tallahassee
 Maranatha Christian School, Tallahassee
North Florida Christian High School, Tallahassee
SAIL High School, Tallahassee
Woodland Hall Academy, Tallahassee

Levy County
Bronson High School, Bronson
Cedar Key School, Cedar Key
Chiefland High School, Chiefland
New Hope Charter School, Chiefland
Williston High School, Williston

Liberty County
Liberty County High School, Bristol

Madison County
Madison County High School, Madison

Manatee County
Bayshore High School, Bradenton
Braden River High School, Bradenton
Bradenton Christian School, Bradenton
Lakewood Ranch High School, Bradenton
Manatee High School, Bradenton
Manatee School for the Arts, Palmetto
PAL Opportunity Charter School, Bradenton
Palmetto High School, Palmetto
Richard Milburn Academy, Bradenton
Southeast High School, Bradenton

Private
Community Christian School, Bradenton
St. Stephen's Episcopal School, Bradenton

Marion County

Public

Belleview High School, Belleview
CFCC Academy, Belleview
Dunnellon High School, Dunnellon
Forest High School, Ocala
Lake Weir High School, Ocala
Marion Technical Institute, Ocala
North Marion High School, Citra
Vanguard High School, Ocala
West Port High School, Ocala

Private

Ocala Christian Academy, Ocala
St. John Lutheran School, Ocala
Trinity Catholic High School, Ocala

Martin County

Public
Clark Advanced Learning Center, dual enrollment high school, Stuart
Jensen Beach High School, Jensen Beach
Martin County High School, Stuart
South Fork High School, Stuart

Private
Community Christian Academy, Stuart
Hobe Sound Christian Academy, Hobe Sound
The Pine School, Hobe Sound/Stuart

Miami-Dade County

Public
Alonzo and Tracy Mourning Senior High Biscayne Bay Campus, North Miami
American High School, Miami
Barbara Goleman High School, Miami Lakes
Booker T. Washington High School, Miami
Coral Gables Senior High School, Coral Gables
Dr. Michael M. Krop High School, Miami
Felix Varela High School, Miami
G. Holmes Braddock High School, Miami
Hialeah Gardens High School, Hialeah
Hialeah High School, Hialeah
Hialeah-Miami Lakes High School, Hialeah/Miami Lakes
Homestead High School, Homestead
John A. Ferguson High School, Miami
Miami Beach High School, Miami Beach
Miami Carol City High School, Miami Gardens
Miami Central High School, Miami
Miami Coral Park High School, Miami
Miami Edison Senior High School, Miami
Miami High School, Miami
Miami Jackson High School, Miami
Miami Killian High School, Miami
Miami Norland High School, Miami Gardens
Miami Northwestern High School, Miami
Miami Palmetto High School, Pinecrest
Miami Southridge High School, Cutler Bay
Miami Springs High School, Miami Springs
Miami Sunset High School, Miami
North Miami Beach High School, North Miami Beach
North Miami Senior High School, North Miami
Ronald W. Reagan Doral High School, Doral
South Dade High School, Homestead
South Miami High School, South Miami
Southwest Miami High School, Miami
Westland Hialeah High School, Hialeah
Young Men's Preparatory Academy (all-boys), Miami

Private
AIU High School, North Miami Beach
Allison Academy School,  North Miami Beach
Archbishop Coleman F. Carroll High School, Miami
Archbishop Curley-Notre Dame High School, Miami
Belen Jesuit Preparatory School (all-boys), Miami
Carrollton School of the Sacred Heart (all-girls), Miami
Champagnat Catholic, Hialeah
Christopher Columbus High School (all-boys), Miami
Colonial Christian School of Homestead, Homestead
Dade Christian School, Miami Lakes
Edison Private School, Hialeah
Florida Christian School, Miami
Greater Miami Academy, Miami
Gulliver Preparatory School, Miami
Immaculata-Lasalle High School, Miami
International Studies Charter High School, Coral Gables
La Progresiva Presbyterian School, Miami
Miami Christian School, Miami
Miami Country Day School, Miami
Monsignor Edward Pace High School, Miami
Northwest Christian Academy, North Miami
Our Lady of Lourdes Academy (all-girls), Miami
Palmer Trinity School, Palmetto Bay
Palmetto Bay Academy, Palmetto Bay
Princeton Christian School, Homestead
Rabbi Alexander S. Gross Hebrew Academy, Miami Beach
Ransom Everglades School, Miami
Riviera Schools, Miami
St. Brendan High School, Miami
Samuel Scheck Hillel Community Day School, North Miami Beach
Westminster Christian School, Miami
Westwood Christian Day Schools, Miami
Yeshiva Toras Chaim Jewish School, Miami Beach

Magnet
Coral Reef High School, Miami (magnet)
Design and Architecture High School, Miami (architecture magnet)
José Marti Math and Science Technology (MAST) 6-12 Academy (math, science and technology magnet)
MAST Academy, Miami (maritime and science technology magnet)
Miami Arts Studio 6-12 @ Zelda Glazer (music, visual arts, broadcasting, technology production, theatre, dance, orchestra and band) 
Miami Lakes Educational Center, Miami Lakes (technical magnet)
New World School of the Arts, Miami (music, visual arts, dance, and theater magnet)
Robert Morgan Educational Center, Miami (vocational magnet)
School for Advanced Studies, Miami (college prep magnet)
School for Applied Technologies, Miami (magnet)
TERRA Environmental Research Institute, Miami (magnet)
William H. Turner Technical Arts High School, Miami (technical magnet)

Charter
Academy of Arts & Minds, Miami
Archimedean Upper Conservatory, Miami
Corporate Academy North, Miami
Corporate Academy South, Miami
Doctors Charter School of Miami Shores, Miami Shores
Doral Academy High School, Doral
Doral Performing Arts & Entertainment Academy, Doral
International Studies Charter High School, Miami
Keys Gate Charter High School, Homestead
Life Skills Center Miami-Dade County, Miami
Mater Academy Charter High School, Miami
Mater Academy East High School, Miami
Mater Performing Arts & Entertainment Academy, Miami
Miami Arts Charter School, Miami
School for Integrated Academics & Technologies (SIATech), Miami
Somerset Academy Charter High School, Miami
Transitional Learning Academy, Miami

Monroe County
Coral Shores High School, Plantation Key
Island Christian School, Plantation Key
Key West High School, Key West
Marathon High School, Marathon

Nassau County
Fernandina Beach High School, Fernandina Beach
Hilliard Middle-Senior High School, Hilliard
West Nassau High School, Callahan
Yulee High School, Yulee

Okaloosa County
Baker K-12 School, Baker
Calvary Christian Academy, Fort Walton Beach
Choctawhatchee Academy, Fort Walton Beach
Choctawhatchee Senior High School, Fort Walton Beach
Crestview High School, Crestview
Crestview Vocational-Technical Center, Crestview
Fort Walton Beach High School, Fort Walton Beach
Laurel Hill School (K-12), Laurel Hill
Niceville High School, Niceville
Okaloosa Applied Technology Center, Fort Walton Beach
Okaloosa-Walton Collegiate High School, Niceville
Rocky Bayou Christian School, Niceville

Okeechobee County
New Endeavor High School, Okeechobee
Okeechobee Alternative High School, Okeechobee (8 - 12 Grade)
Okeechobee High School, Okeechobee (10 - 12 Grade)
Tantie Juvenile Residential Facility

Orange County
Apopka High School, Apopka
Colonial High School, Orlando
Cypress Creek High School, Orlando
Dr. Phillips High School, Orlando
East River High School, Orlando
Edgewater High School, Orlando
Freedom High School, Orlando
Geneva School, Winter Park
Jones High School, Orlando
Lake Nona High School, Orlando
Maynard Evans High School, Orlando
O-Tec Middle Florida Technology School, Orlando
O-Tec Westside Technology School, Winter Garden
Oak Ridge High School, Orlando
Ocoee High School, Ocoee
Olympia High School, Orlando
Robert Hungerford Preparatory High School, Eatonville
St. Lillie V. High School, Orlando
Timber Creek High School, Orlando
University High School, Orlando
Wekiva High School, Apopka
West Orange High School, Winter Garden
William R. Boone High School, Orlando
Windermere High School, Windermere
Winter Park High School, Winter Park

Private
Agape Christian Academy, Orlando
American School of Leadership, Orlando
Bishop Moore High School, Orlando
Central Florida Christian Academy, Orlando
Faith Christian Academy
The First Academy, Orlando
Lake Highland Preparatory School, Orlando
Orangewood Christian School, Maitland
Orlando Lutheran Academy, Orlando
Pine Castle Christian Academy
Real Life Christian Academy, Clermont

Osceola County
Celebration High School, Celebration
Gateway High School, Kissimmee
Harmony High School, Harmony
Heritage Christian School, Kissimmee
Liberty High School, Kissimmee
New Dimensions High School, Kissimmee
Osceola County School For The Arts, Kissimmee
Osceola High School, Kissimmee
Poinciana High School, Kissimmee
Professional and Technical High School, Kissimmee
St. Cloud High School, St. Cloud

Palm Beach County
American Heritage School, Delray Beach
Atlantic Community High School, Delray Beach
The Benjamin School, North Palm Beach
Boca Raton Christian School, Boca Raton
Boca Raton Community High School, Boca Raton
Boynton Beach Community High School, Boynton Beach
Cardinal Newman High School, West Palm Beach
Coastal Middle & Senior High School, Lake Park
Delray Youth Vocational, Delray Beach
Alexander W. Dreyfoos, Jr. School of the Arts, West Palm Beach
Dr. Joaquín García High School, Lake Worth Beach
Everglades Preparatory Academy, Pahokee
Forest Hill Community High School, West Palm Beach
Forest Trail Academy Online High School, Wellington
G-STAR School of the Arts for Motion Pictures and Television, West Palm Beach
Goliath Academy High School traditional and online high school, Wellington
Glades Central High School, Belle Glade
Grandview Preparatory School, Boca Raton
Gulfstream Goodwill Career Academy, Boca Raton
Harid Conservatory, Boca Raton
Inlet Grove Community High School, Riviera Beach
John I. Leonard High School, Greenacres
Jupiter Christian School, Jupiter
Jupiter Community High School, Jupiter
The King's Academy, West Palm Beach
Lake Worth Community High School, Lake Worth
Lake Worth Christian School, Boynton Beach
Life Skills Center of Palm Beach County, Boca Raton
Matlock Academy Private Prep High School, West Palm Beach
Olympic Heights Community High School, Boca Raton
Oxbridge Academy, West Palm Beach
Pahokee High School, Pahokee
Palm Beach Central High School, Wellington
Palm Beach Gardens Community High School, Palm Beach Gardens
Palm Beach Lakes Community High School, West Palm Beach
Park Vista Community High School, Lake Worth
Pope John Paul II High School, Boca Raton
Royal Palm Beach Community High School, Royal Palm Beach
St. Andrew's School, Boca Raton
Santaluces Community High School, Lantana
Seminole Ridge Community High School, Loxahatchee
South Technical Academy, Boynton Beach
Spanish River Community High School, Boca Raton
Suncoast Community High School, Riviera Beach
Survivors, West Palm Beach
Survivors Charter School, Boynton Beach
Toussaint L'Ouverture High School for Arts and Social Justice, Delray Beach
Weinbaum Yeshiva High School, Boca Raton
Wellington Community High School, Wellington
West Boca Raton Community High School, Boca Raton
West Technical Education Center, Belle Glade
William T. Dwyer High School, Palm Beach Gardens

Pasco County
Anclote High School, Holiday
East Pasco Adventist Academy, Dade City
F. K. Marchman Technical Center, New Port Richey
Fivay High School, Hudson
Genesis Preparatory School, New Port Richey
Gulf High School, New Port Richey
Hudson High School, Hudson
J. W. Mitchell High School, New Port Richey
Land o' Lakes High School, Land o' Lakes
Pasco High School, Dade City
Richard Milburn Academy, New Port Richey
Ridgewood High School, New Port Richey
River Ridge High School, New Port Richey
Sunlake High School, Land o' Lakes
Wesley Chapel High School, Wesley Chapel
Wiregrass Ranch High School, Wesley Chapel
Zephyrhills High School, Zephyrhills

Pinellas County
Anchor Academy, Dunedin
Bayside High School, Clearwater
Boca Ciega High School, Gulfport
Calvary Christian High School, Clearwater
Canterbury School of Florida, St. Petersburg
Clearwater Central Catholic High School, Clearwater
Clearwater High School, Clearwater
Countryside High School, Clearwater
Dixie M. Hollins High School, St. Petersburg
Dunedin Academy, Dunedin
Dunedin High School, Dunedin
East Lake High School, Tarpon Springs
Gibbs High School, St. Petersburg
Indian Rocks Christian School, Largo
Keswick Christian School, St. Petersburg
Lakewood High School, St. Petersburg
Largo High School, Largo
Lift Academy, Seminole
Newpoint Pinellas, Clearwater
Northeast High School, St. Petersburg
Northside Christian School, St. Petersburg
Osceola High School, Seminole
Palm Harbor Community School, Palm Harbor
Palm Harbor University High School, Palm Harbor
Pinellas County Center for the Arts, St. Petersburg
Pinellas Park High School, Largo
St. Petersburg Catholic High School, St. Petersburg
St. Petersburg Christian School, St. Petesrsburg
St. Petersburg Collegiate High School, St. Petersburg
St. Petersburg High School, St. Petersburg
Schiller Academy, Dunedin
Seminole High School, Seminole
Seminole Vocational Education Center, Seminole
Shorecrest Preparatory School, St. Petersburg
Tarpon Springs High School, Tarpon Springs
Veritas Academy, Largo

Polk County
All Saints' Academy, Winter Haven
ARC-Academic Research Center, Lakeland
Auburndale High School, Auburndale
Bartow High School, Bartow
Chain of Lakes Collegiate High School, Winter Haven
Collegiate High School, Lakeland
Daniel Jenkins Academy of Technology, Haines City
Fort Meade High School, Fort Meade
Frostproof Middle-Senior High School, Frostproof
Gause Academy of Leadership and Applied Technology, Bartow
George W. Jenkins High School, Lakeland
Haines City High School, Haines City
Kathleen High School, Lakeland
Lake Gibson High School, Lakeland
Lake Region High School, Eagle Lake
Lake Wales High School, Lake Wales
Lakeland Christian School, Lakeland
Lakeland High School, Lakeland
Lois Cowles Harrison Center for the Visual and Performing Arts, Lakeland
Maynard E. Traviss Technical Center, Lakeland
McKeel Academy of Technology, Lakeland
Mulberry High School, Mulberry
Ridge Community High School, Davenport
Ridge Technical Center, Winter Haven
Santa Fe Catholic High School, Lakeland
Summerlin Military Academy, Bartow
The Vanguard School, Lake Wales
Winter Haven High School, Winter Haven

Putnam County
Crescent City High School, Crescent City
Interlachen High School, Interlachen
Palatka High School, Palatka

St. Johns County

Public
Allen D. Nease Senior High School, Ponte Vedra
Bartram Trail High School, St. Johns
Creekside High School, St. Johns
First Coast Skills Academy, St. Augustine
First Coast Technical High School, St. Augustine
Pedro Menendez High School, St. Augustine
Ponte Vedra High School, Ponte Vedra
St. Augustine High School, St. Augustine
Tocoi Creek High School, St. Augustine near the World Golf Village

Private
St. Gerard Campus School, St. Augustine
St. Joseph Academy, St. Augustine

State
Florida School for the Deaf and the Blind, St. Augustine

St. Lucie County

Public
Fort Pierce Central High School, Fort Pierce
Fort Pierce Westwood Academy: The WEST Prep Magnet, Fort Pierce
Lincoln Park Academy, Fort Pierce
Port St. Lucie High School, Port St. Lucie
St. Lucie West Centennial High School, Port St. Lucie
Treasure Coast High School, Port St. Lucie

Private
Faith Baptist School, Fort Pierce
John Carroll Catholic High School, Fort Pierce
Morningside Academy, Port St. Lucie
Victory Forge Military Academy, Port St. Lucie

Santa Rosa County
Central High School, Milton
Gulf Breeze High School, Gulf Breeze
Jay High School, Jay
Locklin Technical Center, Milton
Milton High School, Milton
Navarre High School, Navarre
Pace High School, Pace
Victory Christian Academy, Jay

Sarasota County
Booker High School, Sarasota
North Port High School, North Port
Pine View School, Osprey
Riverview High School, Sarasota
Sarasota High School, Sarasota
Suncoast Polytechnical High School, Sarasota, Florida
Venice High School, Venice

Private
Bishop Nevins School
Cardinal Mooney High School
The GAP School
Julie Rohr Academy
Lutheran Ascension School
NewGate School
Out-of-Door Academy
Sarasota Christian School

Charter
Sarasota Military Academy

Seminole County
Crooms Academy of Information Technology, Sanford
Lake Brantley High School, Altamonte Springs
Lake Howell High School, Winter Park
Lake Mary High School, Lake Mary
Lyman High School, Longwood
Oviedo High School, Oviedo
Paul J. Hagerty High School, Oviedo
Quest Academy, Sanford
Seminole High School, Sanford
Winter Springs High School, Winter Springs

Private
 Altamonte Christian School, Altamonte Springs
 Bear Lake Christian School, Apopka
 Champion Preparatory Academy, Altamonte Springs
 Forest Lake Academy, Apopka
 The Geneva School, Winter Park
 Lake Mary Preparatory School, Lake Mary
 Lawton Chiles Preparatory School, Winter Springs
 Liberty Christian School, Sanford
 Lighthouse Baptist Academy, Winter Park
 The Master's Academy, Oviedo
 New Life Christian Academy, Sanford
 Orangewood Christian School, Maitland
 The Regent Academy, Casselberry
 RiverWalk Christian Academy, Sanford
 Trinity Preparatory School, Winter Park
 The Trinity School, Fern Park

Sumter County
South Sumter High School, Bushnell
The Villages Charter High School, The Villages
Wildwood Middle High School, Wildwood

Suwannee County
Branford High School, Branford
The School Without Walls, Live Oak
Suwannee-Hamilton Area Vocational-Technical Center, Live Oak
Suwannee High School, Live Oak

Taylor County
Taylor County Area Vocational-Technical & General School, Perry
Taylor County High School, Perry

Union County
Union County High School, Lake Butler

Volusia County

Public

Atlantic High School, Port Orange
DeLand High School, DeLand
Deltona High School, Deltona
Mainland High School, Daytona Beach
New Smyrna Beach High School, New Smyrna Beach
Pine Ridge High School, Deltona
Seabreeze High School, Daytona Beach
Spruce Creek High School, Port Orange
University High School, Orange City
T. Dewitt Taylor Middle-High School, Pierson

Private
Calvary Christian Academy, Ormond Beach
Father Lopez Catholic High School, Daytona Beach
Lighthouse Christian Preparatory Academy, DeLand
Trinity Christian Academy, Deltona
Warner Christian Academy, South Daytona

Wakulla County
Wakulla High School, Crawfordville

Walton County
Freeport High School, Freeport
South Walton High School, Santa Rosa Beach
Walton Career Development Center, DeFuniak Springs
Walton Senior High School, DeFuniak Springs

Washington County
Chipley High School, Chipley
Vernon High School, Vernon

References

See also
List of school districts in Florida
Online High Schools in Florida

Florida
High